Bédoin is a commune in the Vaucluse department in the Provence-Alpes-Côte d'Azur region in southeastern France.

Geography
Located at the base of Mont Ventoux, it is the starting point of one of the three routes to the summit of the mountain (the other routes start in Malaucène and Sault).  The Tour de France frequently uses this approach to Mont Ventoux hence the strong presence of cycling in the town.

Sights
Bédoin contains a large Spanish-style church, constructed by Jesuits in 1702.

History
In 1794, the village of Bédoin was destroyed by the Revolutionaries and 66 people were executed.

See also
Communes of the Vaucluse department

References

Communes of Vaucluse